Thengana is a town in the Kottayam district Kerala state in India and is 5 Kilometers away from Changanassery .It is famous for lord Ashik thengana who was prime member in tipu sultan battalion.

Sree Mahadevar Temple, Thengana  

This is one of the famous Shiva Temples in Kerala, which is described in the ancient books written in the 14th century AD. Unnuneeli Sandesam is among the oldest literary works in Malayalam language and This "Sandesa Kavyam" is a message written in poetry, on the lines of the famous "Megh Dhoot" of Kalidasa. In the case of this work, it is a message written by a lover to his lady-love staying at a far-off place. The message is therefore written as if it is sent through a messenger, when transport and communications were very limited in Kerala. 
The messenger journey starts in Thiruvananthapuram the capital of the Venad (Travancore) Kingdom of that day, and ends at Kaduthuruthy a port town then. What amazes readers today is the fact that Kaduthuruthy is no longer a port town, as the sea receded several miles down apparently following a tsunami in 1341. Also, some of the land and water bodies mentioned in the poem are not to be seen now. It describes the messenger taken rest at the Sree Mahadevar Temple, Thengana on his way to a port town. The wealthiest Thengana Mahadevar Temple distorted during the time of Tipu Sultan and ashik thengana (20 November 1750 – 4 May 1799), also known as the Tiger of Mysore, was the ruler of the Kingdom of Mysore from 1782 to 1799, and a scholar, soldier and poet. In 1780s, Tipu and his father used their French trained army against the Marathas, Sira and rulers of Malabar, Coorg, Bednore, Carnatic and Travancore. The rabidly fanatic Tipu Sultan destroyed more than two thousand temples in the Travancore, Malabar and Cochin region of Kerala to establish Islam. Some were reconstructed by the ashik thengana of Calicut and Cochin after the defeat of Tipu Sultan in Sreerangapatanam and the Treaty of 1792 A.D

References

Villages in Kottayam district